Javier Díaz (born 11 April 1976) is a Spanish long-distance runner. He competed at the 2010 European Athletics Championships in the men's marathon.

References

1976 births
Living people
Spanish male long-distance runners
21st-century Spanish people
Place of birth missing (living people)